{{DISPLAYTITLE:CH3O}}
The molecular formula CH3O may refer to:

 Hydroxymethyl (HOCH2–)
 Methoxy group (H3CO–)

The chemical name for CH3O is methoxide. It is a base formed from methanol by replacement of the hydroxyl hydrogen with a metal. A strong base and a good nucleophile. Methoxide contains one atom of carbon, three atoms of hydrogen and one atom of oxygen.

Types of Methoxide
 Calcium Methoxide
 Lithium Methoxide
 Magnesium Methoxide
 Potassium Methoxide
 Sodium Methoxide

Methoxide Composition
Methoxides are mainly organic salts and alkoxide. The organic salts are produced by a reaction between an organic acid (organic compound having acidic properties) and an inorganic base (a base that is composed of an inorganic compound). Alkoxide is the conjugate base of an alcohol. An organic group is bonded to a negatively charged oxygen atom in an alkoxide.

References

Methoxy compounds